"Blue Orchid" is a song by the White Stripes.

Blue orchid may also refer to:

Plants
 Aganisia cyanea, an orchid species from Latin America
 Hybrids between this species and other genera in subtribe Zygopetalinae are also known for having blue or nearly blue flowers
 Bletilla striata, a species of orchid from East Asia. A few varieties have light lavender-blue flowers.
 Cattleya, a genus of orchids. The "coerulea" forms of various species have violet-blue flowers, such as:

 Cattleya bicolor
 Cattleya loddigesii 
 Cleisocentron gokusingii, an almost entirely blue orchid from Borneo
 Cleisocentron merrillianum, an almost entirely blue orchid from Borneo
 Dendrobium ceraula, an orchid species from the Philippines also known as the "Horned Dendrobium". Closely related to Dendrobium victoriae-reginae
 Dendrobium cyanocentrum, an orchid species from New Guinea; see List of Dendrobium species
 Dendrobium leucocyanum, an orchid species from New Guinea; see List of Dendrobium species

 Dendrobium victoriae-reginae, an orchid species from the Philippines also known as "Queen Victoria's Dendrobium"
 Disa graminifolia, an orchid species from South Africa
 Disa purpurascens, an orchid species from South Africa
 Glossodia major, an orchid species from Australia
 Pabstia jugosa, an orchid species from Brazil
 Pescatoria coelestis, an orchid species from Latin America
 Phalaenopsis violacea, an orchid species from Southeast Asia. Certain strains of the coerulea form have violet-blue flowers
 Rhynchostylis coelestis, an orchid species from Indochina
 Thelymitra, a genus containing truly blue orchids, including:
 Thelymitra crinita
 Thelymitra cyanea
 Thelymitra ixioides
 Thelymitra pauciflora
 Thelymitra venosa
 Thelymitra angustifolia
 Tuberolabium woodii, an orchid species from the Philippines
 Vanda coerulea, an orchid species from South Asia
 Hybrids of this species with others in subtribe Aeridinae also have deep purple-blue flowers
 Vanda coerulescens, an orchid species from South Asia
 Vanda tessellata, an orchid species from South Asia

Other uses
 Blue Orchids, a British band
 Operation Blue Orchid, a police operation